Casarabonela is a town and municipality in the province of Málaga, part of the autonomous community of Andalusia in southern Spain. The municipality is situated approximately 48 km from Malaga capital (bordering on the regions of Antequera and Ronda). It has a population of approximately 2,500 residents. The natives are called Moriscos.

-- Etymology—The name derives from the Arabic قصر بنيرة - QaSr Bunayra "The Alcazar (Palace) of Bonéra", as attested to by Ibn al-Qūṭiyya.

References

Municipalities in the Province of Málaga